Emmanuelle Blatmann (born 18 August 1970) is a French diplomat. She is the current Ambassador of France to Nigeria.

Education and career 
Emmanuelle had a unilingual diploma in Oriental language and Civilisation from INALCO. She had her Magistère in International Relations and Action Abroad from Paris I and a master's degree in English from Paris IV.

She was Ambassador of France to Sudan from 2017 to 2021. In October 2021, she was appointed as the Ambassador of France.

References 

Ambassadors of France
1970 births
Living people
French women ambassadors
Ambassadors to Nigeria